Hormoz Farhat (9 August 1928 – 16 August 2021) was a Persian-American composer and ethnomusicologist who spent much of his career in Dublin, Ireland. An emeritus professor of music, he was a fellow of Trinity College, Dublin. Described by the Irish Times as a "a gifted and distinctive composer of contemporary classical music," his compositions include orchestral, concertante, piano and choral music, as well string quartets and chamber works. He also wrote numerous film scores, including that of Dariush Mehrjui's 1969 film The Cow. However, his musicological research dominates his legacy; his writings on the music of Iran—a country which he insisted be called 'Persia'—were pivotal in ethnomusicology, particularly his acclaimed 1990 study The Dastgah Concept in Persian Music.

Life and career
Hormoz Farhat was born on 9 August 1928, in Tehran, the capital city of what was then Imperial State of Persia, but renamed in 1935 as Iran. His father Ebrahim Farat was a senior official at the Persian Ministry of Finance married to his mother Sedique. The Farhat family had descended from a long line of "secularised Muslims", many of whom were civil servicemen like Ebrahim. His cousin Shahin Farhat also became a composer. According to Farhat himself, his early exposure to Iranian music was limited to his father occasionally playing the tar. Instead, he recalls that his ""early musical outlook was mainly western", later filtered through the country's radio station that was established in 1939.

Farhat later moved to the United States and received a BA in music from the University of California, Los Angeles, UCLA (1953), an MA in composition from Mills College, California (1955), and a Ph.D. in composition and ethnomusicology from UCLA (1965). He studied composition with Darius Milhaud, Lukas Foss, and Roy Harris.

In 1959, Farhat founded the Music of Persia Performance Group at UCLA. During his years in California Farhat worked first as an assistant professor of music at California State University, Long Beach (1961–64) and then as associate professor of music at University of California, Los Angeles (1964–69).

On returning to Iran he became a professor and head of the music department at the University of Tehran, (1970–78) as well as the head of the Music Council in the National Iranian Radio and Television Network (1969–78) and Shiraz Arts Festival. He was vice-chancellor at Farabi University in Tehran (1975–77). In 1972 and 1973, he was invited as a visiting professor of music to Harvard University.

Farhat moved to Northern Ireland in 1979 as a senior research fellow at Queen's University, Belfast and then to the Republic of Ireland as the chair, professor and head of the School of Music in Trinity College Dublin (1982–95). Among his students at Trinity College was Donnacha Dennehy, who became among the leading Irish composers of contemporary classical music. He was a guest lecturer at numerous institutions including universities of Michigan, Illinois, Indiana, Princeton, Stanford, Berkeley, Glasgow, Edinburgh, Durham, Amsterdam, Cologne, Warsaw, Ljubljana, Copenhagen, Stockholm and The Smithsonian Institution in Washington D.C. He was the external examiner at the University of Durham School of Music (1991–1994) and the Royal Irish Academy of Music (2001–2004 and 2011–2014).

Hormoz Farhat was married first to Dr Laina (Chazan) Farhat-Holzman in 1952 In Los Angeles, California. They had two children, Kameron Chazan Farhat (deceased), and Ariana (Farhat) Dane.  In the late 60's he was briefly married to the pianist Mahin Zarrinpanjeh in Tehran followed by Jaleh Seraj in 1970 with whom he had a son Ram. In the 80's he had relocated to Dublin, Ireland and was married to the academic philosopher Maria Baghramian and had a son Robert. Farhat died in Dublin, Ireland, aged 93.
In December 2021 the University College Cork and the University of Tehran jointly organised a virtual memorial for Prof. Farhat.

Music

Overview
His compositions have been performed widely by, among many others, the BBC Symphony Orchestra and English Chamber Orchestra and most recently by the pianist Soheil Nasseri in Carnegie Hall and Merkin Hall in New York as well as in the Strathmore Music Center.

Selected recordings 
 String Quartets, Nos. 1, 2 & 3: St Petersburg String Quartet & Arvand String Quartet (Ravi-Azar-Kimia Institute, 2007).
 Persian Autumn (piano work): Mary Dullea, piano (Divine Arts, 2020).

Selected compositions 
Orchestral works
 Sinfonia Concertante, for seven solo instruments, soprano and orchestra
 Mazandarani Rhapsody, for orchestra
 Theme and Variations
 Sinfonietta
 Three Songs of Sa'di, for soprano and orchestra
 Fantasy and Fugue, for string orchestra
 Concerto Grosso, for piano and string orchestra
 Flute Concerto
 Clarinet Concerto
 Sougue, elegy for orchestra
 Nouveau rivage and La Nuit éternelle, two orchestral pieces after the poem "Le Lac" of Alphonse de Lamartine.

Chamber music
 6 string quartets
 3 wind trios
 Duo for Violin and Viola
 Divertimento for Saxophone Quartet (published, Chicago: Leblanc Music Publishers, 1966)
 Piano Quintet
 Partita for Wind Quintet

Piano music
 Theme and Variations
 Persian Suite (4 pieces)
 2 Sonatas
 Four Suites
 Four Concert Études
 24 Essays
 Five Bagatelles

Vocal music
 Two Songs on Poems by Sa'di, for soprano, violin and harp (1957)
 Be Yad-e Neyshapur [In Memory of Neyshapur]; a "chain" of seven songs on Rubaiyat of Omar Khayyam (1959)
 Three Persian Songs, for soprano, flute, cello and piano (1962)
 several pieces for a cappella choir

Motion picture scores
Scores for feature films by prominent Iranian film directors Dariush Mehrjui: Gaav (The Cow, 1969), Postchi (Postman), and Aagha-ye Haaloo (Mr. Naive, 1970); and Nasser Taghvai: Aaraamesh dar hozoor-e digaraan (Tranquility in the Presence of Others, 1972); and Saadegh Kordeh (Sadeq the Kurdish, 1973). In 1970, Farhat was awarded The Golden Plaque for Best Music for the score of Mehrjui's internationally acclaimed film Gaav.

Selected publications 
Books:
 The Traditional Art Music of Iran (Tehran: Ministry of Culture and Arts Press, 1973).
 
 Present Past: Notes from the Life of a Persian/American Composer in Ireland. Ibex Publishers, Bethesda, 2018.
 Rhapsody Mazandarani for Orchestra (Amsterdam: Persian Dutch Network, 2020).

Persian Translations:

 Counterpoint by Kent Kennan (Tehran: University of Tehran Press, 1974).
 Dastgah dar Musiqi-ye Irani (a Persian translation by Mehdi Pur-Mohammad of "The Dastgah Concept in Persian Music") (Tehran: Part Press, 2002).

Articles
 "Old and New Values in Changing Cultural Patterns", in Iran: Past, Present and Future (Aspen Institute, 1976).
 64 articles in the Persian encyclopaedia Daerattomaaref (Tehran: -e Farsi, 1976).
 The article on Iran in the New Grove Dictionary of Music and Musicians (London: MacMillan, 1980).
 "Scales and Intervals: Theory and Practice", in Irish Musical Studies, ed. Gerard Gillen and Harry White (Blackrock Co. Dublin: Irish Academic Press, 1990).
 Ten articles in Encyclopaedia Iranica, ed. E. Yarshater.
 "Western Influences on Persian Music", in Muzikolski Zbornik (Musicological Annual) XVII (Ljubljana, 1991).
 "The Evolution of Style and Content in Performance Practices of Persian Traditional Music", in: Muzikoloski Zbornik (Musicological Annual) XXXIII (Ljubljana, 1997).
 
 7 articles in the second edition of the New Grove Dictionary of Music and Musicians (London: MacMillan, 2001).

References

Citations

Sources

Further reading

External links 
 String Quartet No. 2 by Hormoz Farhat
 An Interview with Hormoz Farhat (Video: BBC Persian TV)
 A Tribute to Hormoz Farhat (Contemporary Music Centre, Dublin, Ireland)
 

1928 births
2021 deaths
20th-century classical composers
Academics of Queen's University Belfast
California State University, Long Beach faculty
Ethnomusicologists
Fellows of Trinity College Dublin
Iranian composers
Iranian emigrants to Ireland
Irish classical composers
Mills College alumni
People associated with Durham University
People from Tehran
Pupils of Lukas Foss
University of California, Los Angeles alumni
Academic staff of the University of Tehran